Sue Devaney (born Susan Barber, 2 July 1967) is an English actress. Her roles include Debbie Webster in Coronation Street, Rita in Jonny Briggs, Liz Harker in Casualty and Jane in Dinnerladies.

Career
Devaney has played various roles on British television including; Debbie Webster in Coronation Street (1984–1985, 2019–present), Rita Briggs in Jonny Briggs (1985–1987), Liz Harker in Casualty  (1994–1997), and Jane in Dinnerladies (1998–2000). In the early 1990s she appeared in a commercial for the Gateway supermarket chain (later Somerfield). In 2009, she played the role of Peggy in the Channel 4 drama Shameless, and lent her voice to the role of Jane in Carol Donaldson's BBC Radio 4 play Normal and Nat. Devaney performed at the Marlowe Theatre, Canterbury as the Fairy Godmother in Cinderella, Friday 2 December 2011 – Sunday 22 January 2012. In 2013, she appeared in the ITV comedy-drama series Great Night Out as Linda, and played Carmel in the BBC comedy drama Being Eileen. In April 2013, she appeared in the BBC Scotland produced Glasgow-based soap River City.

On stage, she has appeared in numerous productions, including A Taste of Honey, Beggars Opera, The Wizard of Oz, Love's Labours Lost, When We Are Married, The Wind in the Willows and The Land of the Living. In 2014, she starred as Rosie in the musical Mamma Mia! for a 10-week summer season at the Blackpool Opera House, in the Winter Gardens from 20 June to 31 August.

Filmography

References

External links

1967 births
Living people
20th-century English actresses
21st-century English actresses
Actresses from Lancashire
English soap opera actresses
English television actresses
English voice actresses
People from Ashton-under-Lyne